The Danelectro C model guitars were the first instruments designed by Danelectro, coming in both single and dual pickup versions. Designed by 1953, until being replaced by the Danelectro U model in 1956. they were put into production and retailed from 1954 to 1955

Unlike most all the later Danelectro instruments, the C model was a solid body construction made of poplar and came in a peanut-like body shape. These early guitars did not have a modern truss rod, but had a ¾" square aluminum tube to prevent the neck from warping.

On debut these first guitars predated Danelectro's now signature lipstick pickup design, and instead wrapped their pickups in vinyl tape and placed them hidden under a melamine pickguard. This design feature ceased in 1955 when Nathan Daniel apparently acquired a job lot of surplus lipstick tubes which he utilised for makeshift pickup covers. The pickups when both selected are wired in series rather than the more standard parallel used today by most big brands.

References

Danelectro electric guitars